James Prescott may refer to:

Jimmy Prescott (1930–2011), English footballer
James Arthur Prescott (1890–1987), Anglo-Australian agricultural scientist
James H. Prescott (born 1934), American politician   
James W. Prescott (born 1934), United States developmental psychologist
James Prescott (footballer) (born 1914), English footballer
Jim Prescott, character in 24